←2014 - 2015 - 2016→

This is a list of Japanese television dramas shown within Japan during the year of 2015.

Winter
Series

References

See also
 List of Japanese television dramas
 2015 in Japanese television

Dramas
2015 Japanese television dramas